Statistics of Úrvalsdeild in the 1940 season.

Overview
It was contested by 4 teams, and Valur won the championship. Valur's Sigurpáll Jónsson and Víkingur's Ingólfur Isebarn were the joint top scorers with 4 goals.

League standings

Results

References

Úrvalsdeild karla (football) seasons
Iceland
Iceland
Urvalsdeild